Qumran is an archaeological site in the West Bank.

Qumran may also refer to:

 Qumran cemetery
 Qumran Caves, a set of caves in the West Bank
 52301 Qumran, the asteroid Qumran, 52301st asteroid catalogued
 Revue de Qumran, see List of theology journals
 A fictional Arab country in the television programme Yes Minister

See also
 Qumran Scrolls, the Dead Sea Scrolls